Three Thieves is a 2019 Nigerian comedy thriller film directed by Udoka Oyeka, written by Egbemawei Sammy, Abba Makama and Africa Ukoh produced by Trino Motion Pictures.
It was released across Cinemas on October 4.

Plot
Due to a case of mistaken identity, three dissatisfied friends are contracted to commit a seemingly simple theft. Even worse, the man originally contracted for the job is on the hunt for them. Things unfold and they just might be adding kidnapping to the list of crimes they are committing. With a comedic twist to it all, it’s a wonder how they end up as heroes of the day.

Cast

Release
The official trailer for the film was released on 10 September 2019 and the press screening in Lagos which held on the 12th September, 2019. Three Thieves premiered at the Genesis Cinemas Oniru on 27 September 2019 with guests like Frank Donga and Lasisi Elenu and was released across cinemas on October 4, 2019.

Critical reception
Three Thieves received reviews from critics. 
According to Precious of MamaZeus “If you are ever going to judge anything by its cover or in this case, trailer…. Stop! Retrace those steps as Three Thieves is a Nollywood rarity.” 
Tha Revue praised the movie production and cinematography which gave the audience pleasant viewing experience. He also highlighted the chemistry and comedy between the three lead characters Koye, Shawn and Frank. 
Ifeoma Okeke of Business Day Nigeria had this to say as the movie release was approaching. “As Nigerian movies make international recognition, only very few movies have a mix of humor, capture every day to day activity and yet do not losing grip on moral lessons. One such few films are the ‘Three Thieves, which will be out in cinemas on the 4th of October, 2019.” 
Osa Amadi from Vanguard “It is a creative work of comedy with the intent to keep the ribs of the audience cracking with laughter from beginning to end, and it succeeded in that objective and even more.

Accolades

Film Festivals

See also
 List of Nigerian films of 2019

References

External links
 
 

2019 films
2019 comedy-drama films
Nigerian comedy-drama films
English-language Nigerian films
Films directed by Udoka Oyeka
2010s English-language films